Aperture Indexing may refer to one of two technologies used by Nikon to couple aperture settings on F-mount lenses to cameras:

 Aperture Indexing (Meter coupling prong), an early form that used a coupling "prong", extended to semi-automatic on some models
 Automatic Maximum-Aperture Indexing (also known by the designation "AI"), a more advanced form introduced in 1977